Giorgi Vashadze (born 8 July 1981) is a Harvard Business School Executive Education alumnus, Georgian politician and international policy expert who served as a member of the Parliament of Georgia from 2012 to 2016. He is a founder and international key expert of Innovation and Development Foundation (IDF), international think-tank that is committed to design public policy solutions and reform packages. In May 2016, Giorgi Vashadze founded a political party ‘Political Platform - New Georgia ’. He is also a founder of Computer Literacy Foundation that was established in 2012 and Georgia Reforms and Partnership Enterprise (GRAPE). Giorgi Vashadze previously served as a Deputy-Minister at the Ministry of Justice between 2010 and 2012, and a Chairman of Civil Registry Agency from 2006 to 2010. 

Giorgi Vashadze was born in Chiatura, Georgia. After graduating with a dual degree from Ivane Javakhishvili Tbilisi State University and Georgian Technical University, he was appointed as a Head of Passport and Population Registration Service to Chugureti Register Agency of Ministry of Justice of Georgia in 2005. Shortly, he moved up the career ladder and was assigned to the post of at first, Deputy-Chairman (from 2005 to 2006), and then, the Chairman of Civil Registry Agency of the Ministry of Justice from 2006 to 2010. In 2009-2010, he attended the Executive Education program at Harvard Business School. Between 2010 and 2012 he served as a Deputy-Minister of Justice of Georgia. 

During his term in office at Civil Registry Agency, Giorgi Vashadze initiated and implemented many landmark projects at the intersection of public administration and e-governance. The main reform was introduction of ID cards that substituted for previous forms of citizen identification that formed a strong basis for realizing other breakthrough reforms concerning biometric passports, digital signature, citizen portal - My.gov.ge, unified Demographic Registry, visual recognition, and accelerated services. Giorgi Vashadze’s projects had significantly contributed to augmenting corrupted practices that dominated public sector, and aided Georgia’s impeccable fight and win over corruption.

After assuming office as a Deputy-Minister of Justice in 2010, Giorgi Vashadze was in charge of establishment of Public Service Halls. He authored the reforms in public sector that were aimed to modernize public services and transform bureaucratic state apparatus into citizen-oriented and business friendly platform through innovative means – Public Service Hall. Development of Georgian Public Service halls led to massive improvements in administrative services and growth of Georgia in World Bank Ease of Doing Business rankings.

In October 2012, Giorgi Vashadze was elected as a member of the Parliament of Georgia on a party list of the United National Movement (UNM). He was also a member of the United National Movement fraction, deputy chairman of the Budget and Finance Committee, member of the Education, Science and Culture Committee, member of the Commission on Implementation of Quality and Internal Control Procedures of Audit, Financial and Economic, Legal and Organizational Activities of the State Audit Service. He left the UNM on 5 May 2016, criticizing it for "closed style of governance by a narrow circle of leadership".

In 2014, Giorgi Vashadze founded an international think-tank Innovation and Development Foundation (IDF) that has its headquarters in Tbilisi, Kiev and Chicago, and provides technical and advisory expertise in modernization, planning and implementation process of large-scale reforms in public sector. IDF has been actively involved in state reforms in different countries since 2014, and contributed to successful transformation in Ukraine towards public procurement (Prozorro), creation of public service hall (Gotovo), establishment of National Anti-Corruption Bureau (NABU), drafting and adoption of High Anti-Corruption Court (HACC) legislation and enactment of Economic Modernization Act of Ukraine. Innovation and Development Foundation run by Giorgi Vashadze is also actively pursuing to adopt and implement the use of blockchain technology in order to aid governance process and strengthen anti-corruption measures.

Education 

Giorgi Vashadze holds Bachelor and Master degrees in Public Administration from Georgian Technical University and a degree in Law from Tbilisi State University. He studied at Harvard Business School in the Program for Leadership Development from between 2009 and 2010.

Career 

Giorgi Vashadze has an outstanding track record in initiation, planning and management of fundamental reforms. Since 2005 he was actively involved in the programs of Ministry of Justice of Georgia and successfully implemented number of projects. As the head of the Civil Registry Agency (Georgia, 2006-2010) Giorgi Vashadze initiated and accomplished implementation of biometric passports, ID cards, digital signature, personal portal www.my.gov.ge, development of the Unified Demographic Registry, visual recognition, accelerated services, remote services (online, call at home), Baby Book project etc. All these programs and projects were crucial for improvement of the services, as well as effectively eliminating corruption and raising Georgia’s international standing.

Giorgi Vashadze being a Deputy Minister of Justice was in charge of establishment of Public Service Hall (2011). The concept was based on the principle of Everything in One Place. The project of Public Service Halls was recognized as the most successful Georgian reform of 2011. Over the past years, Georgia took the leading places in rankings of the World Bank, the European Bank for Reconstruction and Development (EBRD) and the Transparency International (TI).

There are several outstanding initiatives of Giorgi Vashadze that were or are being successfully implemented. eHealth project  (2011) aimed to develop a system that would facilitate easy and comfortable delivery of healthcare services. eLocal Governance (2011) initiative aimed to develop a solution that would pilot the electronic governance system in the local government authorities. The goal of the Village House program (2012) was to develop a solution that would facilitate easy and comfortable delivery of healthcare services.
Establishment of the Computer Literacy Foundation was one of the most successful activities of Giorgi Vashadze. The project aimed to establish centers equipped with basic technological infrastructure and led by trained staff in order to ensure educational and cultural environment for the rural population of Georgia.

References 

Members of the Parliament of Georgia
1981 births
Living people
Harvard Business School alumni
Tbilisi State University alumni
21st-century politicians from Georgia (country)
Recipients of the Presidential Order of Excellence